Paolo Tarnassi (29 October 1890, in Santa Maria Capua Vetere – 20 December 1942, in Mitrofanovka) was an Italian General during World War II.

He attended the Liceo Galvani in Bologna. In 1910 he was appointed as a career lieutenant in the cavalry of the Italian Army; he fought in the Italo-Turkish War, the First World War and the Second Italo-Ethiopian War.

He was promoted to lieutenant colonel in 1934 and to colonel in 1939, assuming command of the 13th Cavalry Regiment Cavalleggeri di Monferrato in the same year. From December 1941 to April 1942 he was attacked to the II Army Corps, after which he was briefli attached to the Alessandria Army Corps. In June 1942 he was once again attached to the II Army Corps, now operating on the Eastern Front as part of the Italian Army in Russia (ARMIR); in July he was promoted to brigadier general, and in August he was made commander of the Kantemirovka military district, being also entrusted with enforcing discipline and security in the rear of the II Army Corps and supervising operations by the military police. He was later accused of war crimes for the execution of civilians in the area under his control. On 20 December 1942, during Operation Little Saturn, he was killed by a Soviet air raid in Mitrofanovka.

References

1890s births
1942 deaths
Italian generals
Italian military personnel of World War II
Italian military personnel killed in World War II
Italian military personnel of the Italo-Turkish War
Italian military personnel of World War I
Italian military personnel of the Second Italo-Ethiopian War
Deaths by airstrike during World War II